Montague Richard Leverson (2 March 1830 – 26 September 1925) was a British lawyer who emigrated to the US, where he was a rancher in Colorado, and lawyer and politician in California. Leverson was also a homeopathic physician, anti-vaccinationist and germ theory denialist.

Early life
He was born in London on 2 March 1830, the son of Montague Levyson and his wife Elizabeth. He was the brother of the diamond merchant George Bazett Colvin Leverson, and uncle of Ernest David Leverson, husband of Ada Leverson; his brother James was also a diamond merchant, and George and James became the managers of Pittar, Leverson & Co. His family was Jewish, but he abandoned kosher at age 18. From 1852 to 1859 he was a sole practitioner as a patent agent in Bishopsgate, London, then going into partnership.

At this period Leverson was a supporter of the Association for Promoting Jewish Settlements in Palestine founded by Abraham Benisch in 1852. It also involved William Henry Black, and did not continue long. He read a paper to the first conference of the National Association for the Promotion of Social Science, in 1857, On the Outlines of Jurisprudence.

Radical lawyer in London
The Orsini affair trials of Simon François Bernard and Edward Truelove in 1858 brought Leverson prominence as a radical lawyer, acting as solicitor for their defences, with Edward James as counsel. Luigi Pianciani dedicated his La Rome des Papes (1859) to Leverson.

Leverson was on good terms, he claimed, with Giuseppe Mazzini, Giuseppe Garibaldi, Louis Blanc and Victor Hugo. His brother George was involved in fundraising for Garibaldi: the New York Times in 1860 wrote that "George Leverson, the well-known advocate of the cause of liberty, and brother to the Solicitor in Dr. Bernard's and the Press Prosecution Defences, is Treasurer pro tem." for a London fund.

In 1861 the secularist Charles Bradlaugh became managing clerk in Leverson's legal practice. In November of that year, Leverson acted on behalf of Bradlaugh in a criminal libel case brought by Sydney Gedge, concerning a church rates issue. In 1862 an arrangement was made for Leverson to give Bradlaugh his articles as a solicitor. Subsequently, the business got into difficulties. Bradlaugh left in 1864. In 1865 Leverson was elected to the Council of the Reform League.

In the US
Giving evidence in 1869 to a committee of the House of Representatives on electoral fraud, Leverson stated that he had come to the US in January 1867, and had been admitted to the bar in the United States in May 1868. As he wrote to Andrew Johnson in August 1867, he arrived with a letter from Charles Francis Adams Sr. in London, attesting to Leverson's support for the Union during the American Civil War. He offered to advise the embattled Johnson. He gave evidence in the fraud matter against Tammany Hall and its practices in relation to naturalization.
He himself was naturalized as a US citizen in 1867.

Rancher
From 1872 Leverson had a ranch in Douglas County, Colorado, near Larkspur, and lectured on political economy at Golden, Colorado.

Leverson involved himself in the Lincoln County War of 1878. He wrote to Carl Schurz in August 1878, describing the situation in Lincoln County. He wrote also to President Rutherford B. Hayes, suggesting that Samuel Beach Axtell should be removed as Governor of the New Mexico Territory. It appeared later that Leverson was angling to have himself appointed as Governor. He was mocked by The Santa Fe New Mexican.

On the ground, Leverson had a part in the release of John Chisum from the San Miguel County jail. Chisum was being held there in spring 1878, for the sake of a debt owed to Thomas B. Catron. In court, Catron was arguing for a writ of ne exeat. Leverson has been credited with bringing together Chisum's supporters, with the effect that he left jail on bail of $25,000, and the matter of the debt, related to meat packing business, was settled. In June, Judge Samuel A. Parks ruled that ne exeat could not be granted in New Mexico.

Ostensibly, Leverson had been invited to Lincoln, New Mexico by Juan Patrón, a member of the New Mexico Territorial Legislature in Santa Fe, and elected its Speaker in 1877. It has been said that he was already a business associate of Chisum. He represented himself in correspondence as interested in planting a substantial English colony in the lower Pecos valley, where Chisum's ranch lay, obstructed solely by a lack of law and order. His prolific letter-writing chose as targets influential figures of the Santa Fe Ring, such as Catron and Stephen Benton Elkins.

Frank Warner Angel, the Special Agent looking into the New Mexico violence, summed up Leverson as "knows 6 times as much as he can prove & 6 times more than anyone else", and identified him as a strong supporter of Alexander McSween.

In politics
Leverson in 1879 moved to San Francisco, where he worked as a lawyer. He was a member of the California State Assembly for the 12th district in 1883–1884. In California he encountered Henry George, around 1880. He presented himself as a political economist, and mentioned his 1876 primer on the topic, published in New York. He dropped the names of his English contacts William Ellis and John Stuart Mill; and stated that, now he had read George's Progress and Poverty (1879) to which Joseph LeConte had introduced him, he felt his primer should be rewritten. He became an advocate for Georgism.

At the Proportional Representation Congress in Chicago in 1893, Leverson spoke on "The Proxy System as a Means of Real Representation." He mentioned that such a system, on the model of a joint-stock company, was in his draft proposal for a constitution for Colorado State of 1875. For the moment, he supported a simpler proportional representation approach.

During the Philippine–American War, Leverson supported the American Anti-Imperialist League. On his own initiative, he wrote from Fort Hamilton to Emilio Aguinaldo, which allowed opponents to characterise the League as "seditious". Another letter, to Galicano Apacible, caused the League to claim he was not a member.  He spoke at an anti-imperialist rally in Philadelphia in February 1900, and sent the text of his speech to Leo Tolstoy.

Anti-vaccination

In 1893 Leverson obtained a medical degree at Baltimore Medical College. He styled himself "Dr Leverson", and became a homeopathic physician and anti-vaccinator, speaking against vaccination in London in March 1908, with an introduction by letter from Sarah Newcomb Merrick.

Leverson was a germ theory denialist who opposed the views of Louis Pasteur. He became a supporter of Antoine Béchamp. He travelled to meet Béchamp in Paris, and attended his funeral in 1908. Leverson translated Béchamp's book Blood and Its Third Anatomical Element, in 1911. He was secretary of the Anti-Vaccination Society of America and President of the Brooklyn Anti-Compulsory Vaccination League. He was also an anti-vivisectionist.

The 1923 book by Ethel Douglas Hume, Béchamp or Pasteur?: A Lost Chapter in the History of Biology, was based on manuscripts by Leverson.

Later life
Leverson returned to the United Kingdom in 1900, and regained British citizenship in 1922. He lived in Bournemouth.

Works
Leverson published:

Copyright and Patents; being an Investigation of the Principles of Legal Science applicable to Property in Thought (1854). It was provoked by a House of Lords decision in Jefferys v. Boosey on copyright and the common law a few months earlier. A decade later he stated that "It was to political economy we owe our reasons for permitted any right of property at all [...]".
The Reformers' Reform Bill (1866), pamphlet on electoral law
Common Sense: Or, First Steps in Political Economy (1876)
Primer of Morals (1885)
Thoughts on Institutions of the Higher Education (1893)
Kligalefogs Yulopa e liko kanoms padisipön (1893)
Inoculations and the Germ Theory of Disease (1911)
Pasteur the Plagiarist: The Debt of Science to Béchamp (1911)

Family
Leverson married Kate Hyam. Gerald Finzi was their grandson. The couple separated when he moved to the USA. In old age, around 80, he married again.

Notes

External links
tonyseymour.com, Isaac Marsden, with much material on Leverson
BBC - Who Do You Think You Are? - Esther Rantzen - How we did it - Criminals, www.bbc.co.uk on Esther Rantzen, great-granddaughter of Leverson, the "black sheep", and investigations of allegations about him.

1830 births
1925 deaths
Anti-vivisectionists
British activists
British anti-vaccination activists
British homeopaths
British non-fiction writers
British political writers
British solicitors
Germ theory denialists